Bokovskaya is a rural locality (a stanitsa) in Bokovsky District of Rostov Oblast, Russia, located on the Chir River  south of Rostov-on-Don. Population:   It is also the administrative center of Bokovsky District.

History 
Before a stanitsa was established, there had already been a post station called Bokovskaya, which was first mentioned in official lists in 1873. At the end of the 19th century, the land near the Chir River was being quickly settled by Cossacks and peasants from other regions, although it was situated very far from any major cities.

According to the 1915 census, 395 people lived in the khutor of Bokov. There were two parish schools, a church and two mills. In 1918 the khutor changed its status to stanitsa.

Landmarks 
 St. John the Baptist Church
 Local History Museum of Bokovsky District
 "Heroes never perish" Memorial Complex

Also there are several archaeological sites around. The territory was first settled in the Neolithic Era, and many mounds have been preserved there. All of them are placed under state protection, as they are officially recognized as objects of cultural heritage of Russia

References

Rural localities in Rostov Oblast
Don Host Oblast